GSR may refer to:

Organizations
 Gas Safe Register, in the United Kingdom
 Global Sea Mineral Resources, an underwater mining company
 Groupe Scolaire La Résidence, a French international school in Casablanca, Morocco

Medicine and science
 Galvanic skin response, physiological phenomenon
 Glutathione-disulfide reductase,  enzyme 
 Gunshot residue

Places
 Gerber Scout Reservation, a scouting facility in Michigan, US
 Grand Sierra Resort,  a hotel and casino in Nevada, US

Transport
 Acura Integra GS-R, an automobile 
 Qardho Airport (IATA code: GSR), Somalia

Rail systems
 Great Southern Railway (disambiguation)
 Gondal State Railway, in British India
 Great Sandhills Railway, a Canadian railway

Other uses
Grammata Serica Recensa, a dictionary of Old Chinese
 General Service Respirator, a military gas mask
 SIG Sauer GSR, a pistol variety